Max Sandin (June 3, 1889–September 14, 1971) was a painter and anti-war activist who was persecuted by the United States government during both World Wars for refusal to cooperate with military conscription.

World War I 

When Sandin was drafted into the U.S. military during World War I, he declared himself a conscientious objector. The military would not accept this, on the grounds that his objection was political, not religious, in nature. Subsequently, for refusing to obey an order, Sandin was sentenced to be killed by firing squad. President Wilson commuted that sentence to imprisonment at Fort Leavenworth.

World War II 

Sandin was again imprisoned for refusing to register for the draft in 1943.

War Tax Resistance 

In 1943, Sandin began to refuse to pay taxes that would be destined for military spending. He continued to refuse for the rest of his life.

In 1949, he joined the war tax resistance pledge of Peacemakers, the first non-sectarian organized war tax resistance movement in the United States.

When, in 1961, the government began to seize his social security benefits and small pension for back taxes, leaving him destitute, he began a sit-down protest and hunger strike at the U.S. Treasury building. The United States Secret Service responded by imprisoning him, ostensibly for psychiatric evaluation (he was judged sane and released in a few days).

Other Actions 

Sandin also took part in a blockade designed to stop the deployment of a Polaris nuclear-weapon-armed submarine in 1960.

See also 
 Max Sandin Papers

References

American tax resisters